April Rose Pengilly (pen-GILL-ee; born 12 April 1988), also known as April Rose, is an Australian actress and model.

Early life
April Rose Pengilly is the daughter of INXS member Kirk Pengilly and designer Karen Hutchinson. She attended Wenona School, a girls school on the North Shore of Sydney, and began modelling during Year 12. She has used the stage name April Rose to separate herself from her father.

Career

Modelling

Pengilly signed to Sydney's Chadwick Models at age 16, then to New York's Wilhelmina Models after graduating from high school and became a youth ambassador for the 2006 David Jones Summer collection, along with Megan Gale.

Pengilly has walked for leading designers at Australian Fashion Week, lived and worked in New York, London, Tokyo and Osaka, and fronted major campaigns. She has worked with top photographers Rankin, Steven Chee, Nick Scott, Nicole Bentley, Pierre Toussaint, James Demitri, Bradley Patrick, and Terry Richardson. She has featured on magazine covers and in editorials for InStyle, Elle (UK), The Times (UK), Harper's Bazaar, Marie Claire, Oyster, Seventeen (US), and Glitter (Japan).
 
Pengilly has been selected for many elite roles, including ambassador for leading Australian department store David Jones, face of the Melbourne Fashion Festival, face of the Nokia L’amour cell phone collection, ambassador for Sony, ambassador for Barbie and the "legs" of Japanese stocking label ATSUGI.

In 2009, Pengilly was named Ambassador for the Melbourne Fashion Festival, working alongside J. Alexander and Doutzen Kroes. She has worked as a TV presenter for Fashion TV at London Fashion Week. She signed on as an ambassador for the charity Dementia Australia, adding to her previous involvements with charities including The Eye Foundation, SunSCHine/Sydney Children’s Hospital and the RSPCA.

Pengilly began a fashion and lifestyle blog in 2011. She was nominated for PETA's annual Sexiest Vegetarian Celebrity Awards in 2014.

Acting
Pengilly began studying acting in her spare time, and attended classes at National Institute of Dramatic Art (NIDA) and Actors Centre Australia. She was cast in the independent feature film LBF in 2011. The film is based on the Australian novel Living Between Fucks by Cry Bloxsome and stars Australian actors Toby Schmitz, Gracie Otto, Septimus Caton and Bianca Chiminello. The film, directed by Alex Munt, premiered internationally at South by Southwest festival.

April starred in the independent short film Object in 2013, which screened at the Cannes Film Festival. The following year, Pengilly competed in the 14th Season of Dancing with the Stars. She was partnered with Russian dancer Aric Yegudkin and danced for Dementia Australia. Pengilly and Yegudkin were eliminated in week three despite a score of 29 out of 40. Viewers thought Pengilly and Yegudkin's elimination was unfair, as fellow contestant Mark Holden had received a lower score and broken rules. Holden later offered to swap places with Pengilly.

Pengilly has worked as a television host, covering London Fashion Week for FashionTV. In 2015, Pengilly had a guest role in the Channel 7 miniseries Peter Allen: Not the Boy Next Door. The following year, she had a guest role in Brock. She also appeared in the short films Jinxed, Duffy, and Lovelost.

Struggling to be taken seriously as an actress after her modelling career, Pengilly was ready to move to the USA when she joined the cast of soap opera Neighbours as Chloe Brennan in late 2017 until the show's final episode in August 2022. She made her first appearance on 27 March 2018 and quickly became a fan favourite on the long-running international series.

Personal life 

Pengilly splits her time between her home in Sydney and Melbourne, where the Neighbours studios are located. She has been romantically linked to Jack Osbourne, Tim Commandeur of Operator Please and Panama, James Jennings, drummer for Lime Cordiale, and Alex Laska of Melbourne rock band Kingswood.

Filmography

References

External links

 
 
 https://web.archive.org/web/20110706110205/http://www.lmff.com.au/lmff-tv/lmff-2009/april-rose-pengilly

1988 births
Living people
Australian female models
Models from Sydney
Actresses from Sydney
Australian bloggers
Australian women bloggers
21st-century Australian actresses